Estradiol acetylsalicylate, or estradiol 3-acetylsalicylate, is a synthetic estrogen and estrogen ester – specifically, the C3 acetylsalicylic acid (aspirin) ester of estradiol – which was described in the late 1980s and was never marketed. In dogs, the oral bioavailability of estradiol acetylsalicylate was found to be 17-fold higher than that of unmodified estradiol. However, a subsequent study found that the oral bioavailability of estradiol and estradiol acetylsalicylate did not differ significantly in rats (4.3% and 4.2%, respectively), suggestive of a major species difference.

See also
 List of estrogen esters § Estradiol esters

References

Abandoned drugs
Estradiol esters
Acetylsalicylic acids
Prodrugs
Salicylate esters